Ingiri is a village in Zugdidi Municipality, Samegrelo-Zemo Svaneti, Georgia. The Oireme village belongs to the community. It is situated on Odishi-Guria plain, 4 km from the city of Zugdidi, 65 m above sea level. In the village there is a railway station on the Senaki–Zugdidi line. In the village there are kiwifruit plantations.

Population 
According to the 2014 census, 4,049 people live in the village.

Name 
Ingiri is a new name. In ancient times the village was named Jogejiani(). Presumably the name "Ingiri" is from the Russian name of the Enguri River.

References 

Populated places in Samegrelo-Zemo Svaneti